SMS V3 was a V1-class torpedo boat of the Imperial German Navy. The ship was built by AG Vulcan, completing in 1912. She served in the First World War with the German High Seas Fleet, taking part in the Battle of the Heligoland Bight in 1914 and the Battle of Jutland in 1916. She was retained by the post-war German Navy and was stricken in 1929 and scrapped.

Construction and design
In 1911, the Imperial German Navy placed orders for a flotilla of 12 torpedo boats as part of its shipbuilding programme for that year, with one half flotilla of six ordered from AG Vulcan, and six from Germaniawerft. The 1911 torpedo boats were smaller than those ordered in recent years in order to be more manoeuvrable and so work better with the fleet, which resulted in the numbering series for torpedo boats being restarted. The reduction in size resulted in the ships' seaworthiness being adversely affected, with the 1911 torpedo boats and the similar craft of the 1912 programme acquiring the disparaging nickname "Admiral Lans' cripples".

V3, yard number 319, was launched from Vulcan's Stettin, Prussia (now Szczecin in Poland) shipyard on 14 October 1911 and commissioned on 12 January 1912.

Armament consisted of two  SK L/30 naval guns in single mounts fore and aft, together with four 50 cm (19.7 in) torpedo tubes with one reload torpedo carried. Up to 18 mines could be carried. In 1916 the L/30 guns were replaced by more powerful  SK L/45 guns. In 1921 she was rearmed with two 10.5 cm SK L/45 naval guns and two 50 cm torpedo tubes, and was fitted with new boilers. The ship had a crew of 74 officers and other ranks.

Service
V3 ran aground in 1911, but was successfully refloated. In May 1913 V3 was a member of the 9th Half-Flotilla, 5th Torpedo Boat Flotilla, and remained part of the 9th Half-Flotilla in May 1914.

First World War
On 28 August 1914, a British force of destroyers and cruisers supported by battlecruisers made a sortie into the Heligoland Bight in order to ambush German torpedo boats on patrol, which caused the Battle of Heligoland Bight. The 5th Torpedo Boat Flotilla, including V3, were sent out from Heligoland to investigate sightings of British submarines (which were deployed as bait to draw out German ships), and ran into several British destroyers. The Flotilla then turned away to try and escape the trap, but the torpedo boat , which along with  could not make full speed and lagged behind the rest of the flotilla, was hit by British shells before the arrival of the German cruiser  allowed the 5th Flotilla to escape. In total, however, three German light cruisers (and ) and one torpedo boat of the German outer screen had been sunk.

On 8 September 1915, the 5th and 9th Torpedo Boat Flotillas were on patrol north west of the Horns Reef when the torpedo boat , the leader of the 5th Flotilla, suffered a steering failure and rammed . Two of V1s torpedoes exploded, wrecking V1s bow and sinking G12, killing 35 of V1s crew and 47 of G12s.

At the Battle of Jutland on 31 May–1 June 1916, V3 was part of the 9th Half-Flotilla, 5th Torpedo Boat Flotilla, operating in support of the main German battle fleet. From about 20:15 CET (19:15 GMT), the German torpedo boat flotillas launched a series of torpedo attacks against the British battle line in order to cover the German fleet's turn away from the British. First to attack were the 6th and 9th Flotillas, followed by the 3rd Flotilla. At 20:38, the 5th Flotilla started an attack run, but it was unable to find the British battle-line due to poor visibility caused by fog and smoke, and the attack was aborted. During the night action, the 5th Flotilla was ordered to search for and attack the British fleet, but failed to encounter the British battleships. V3 was undamaged.

Postwar operations
V3 survived the war, and was one of the twelve destroyers that the Reichsmarine was allowed to retain under the Treaty of Versailles. In early 1923 she was serving in the North Sea. By 1929, the Reichsmarine had taken delivery of twelve Type 24 and Type 25 torpedo boats, and therefore disposed of the least useful of its old torpedo boats in order to keep within Treaty limits. She was stricken on 27 March 1929 and was broken up at Wilhelmshaven.

Notes

References

Bibliography

 
 

Torpedo boats of the Imperial German Navy
Ships built in Stettin
1911 ships
World War I torpedo boats of Germany
V1-class destroyers